The Pine Mountain and Zaka Lake Forest Reserve was established by the General Land Office in California on March 2, 1892 with  of the San Rafael Mountains in Santa Barbara County, California. 

On December 22, 1903 the entire forest was combined with Santa Ynez Forest Reserve to create Santa Barbara Forest Reserve and the name was discontinued. 

In the present day it is within the Los Padres National Forest.

See also
Big Pine Mountain

Zaca Fire

References

Forest History Society:Listing of the National Forests of the United States: Text from Davis, Richard C., ed. Encyclopedia of American Forest and Conservation History. New York: Macmillan Publishing Company for the Forest History Society, 1983. Vol. II, pp. 743-788.

External links
Forest History Society

Former National Forests of California
Defunct forest reserves of the United States
San Rafael Mountains
Los Padres National Forest
Protected areas of Santa Barbara County, California
Protected areas established in 1892
1892 establishments in California
1903 disestablishments in California
Protected areas disestablished in the 1900s